Mexcala signata is a jumping spider species in the genus Mexcala that lives in Kenya and Tanzania. It was first described by Wanda Wesołowska in 2009. The species name is Latin for signed, referring to the presence of bright marks on the abdomen.

References

Salticidae
Fauna of Kenya
Fauna of Tanzania
Spiders of Africa
Spiders described in 2009
Taxa named by Wanda Wesołowska